Géza Tóth (22 February 1907 – 29 December 1990) was a Hungarian gymnast. He competed in seven events at the 1928 Summer Olympics.

References

External links
 

1907 births
1990 deaths
Hungarian male artistic gymnasts
Olympic gymnasts of Hungary
Gymnasts at the 1928 Summer Olympics
Sportspeople from Pécs
20th-century Hungarian people